Tracie Morris is an American poet. She is also a performance artist, vocalist, voice consultant, creative non-fiction writer, critic, scholar, bandleader, actor and non-profit consultant. Morris is from Brooklyn, New York. Morris' experimental sound poetry is progressive and improvisational. She is a tenured professor at the Iowa Writers' Workshop.

Education 
Tracie Morris earned a Master of Fine Arts (MFA) in Poetry at Hunter College and her Ph.D in Performance Studies at New York University with an emphasis on speech act theory, poetry and Black aesthetics, under the supervision of José Esteban Muñoz. She also studied classical British acting at the Royal Academy of Dramatic Art (London) and American acting at Michael Howard Studios.

Career
Morris writes about Black culture, power, race, gender, abuse and the body, among other topics, through reverberation and accumulative alterations or substituting, thereby creating dynamic and intimate sound poetry work. Primarily known for her live performances, Morris has written ten books (as of 2021) and has been heavily anthologized as a writer in multiple genres.

Morris emerged as a poet, performer and writer from the Lower East Side poetry scene in the early 1990s. She became known as a local poet in the "slam" scene of the Nuyorican Poets Cafe in New York City, New York, and eventually made the 1993 Nuyorican Poetry Slam team, the same year she won the Nuyorican Grand Slam Championship.  She competed in the 1993 National Poetry Slam held that year in San Francisco with other poets from the Nuyorican team. Morris also won the "national haiku slam" that year and her interest in the form lead her to Asia to research poetic forms and cultures from the region in 1998. She has been a member of the MLA (Modern Language Association), Associated Writing Programs, The Shakespeare Society and The Shakespeare Forum.  Her work has been featured in Fuse Magazine, The Amsterdam News, The Village Voice, Tribes Magazine, Bomb Magazine, The Brooklyn Rail and San Francisco Weekly as well as many cultural and scholarly journals. She has performed at Lincoln Center, St. Mark's Poetry Project, CBGB, the 92nd Street Y, Lollapalooza, South by Southwest, The Whitney Museum, MoMA, Albertine, The New Museum, Centre Pompidou (Paris), Centre for Creative Arts(Durban), Victoria and Albert Museum, Queensland Poetry Festival (Brisbane, Melbourne) and many other regional, national, and international venues. She has presented her work throughout Asia, Africa, Latin America, and Europe.

Morris began performing with music from the outset of her poetry career— those initial collaborations beginning with musicians she met as a member of the Black Rock Coalition. Morris' work is embraced by slam and performance poets as well as the Language Poets, a contemporary poetic avant-garde. She is featured, for example, on Charles Bernstein's Close Listening radio program and was featured at a 2008 conference on Conceptual Poetics alongside Bernstein, Marjorie Perloff, Craig Dworkin and others. Morris also received the Creative Capital Performing Arts award in the year 2000. In addition to being an experimental poet, Morris writes poetry in conventional forms and nonce  forms.

Morris is known as a sound artist and specialist in sound poetry as well as an occasional theatrical performer. (She is also a singer with composer/musician Elliott Sharp's band, Terraplane, and her eponymous band.) Morris was an early collaborator with Ralph Lemon for his Geography Trilogy. Her work was featured in the 2002 Whitney Biennial.  Morris has taught in several institutions of higher education. She is the first tenured African-American poet of the Iowa Writers' Workshop after serving as the program's inaugural distinguished visiting professor of poetry.

Creative and academic fellowships
Morris was the 2007-2008 Center for Programs in Contemporary Writing Fellow at the University of Pennsylvania, was a 2018 Master Artist of the Atlantic Center for the Arts and the 2018-2019 Woodberry Poetry Room Fellow at Harvard University as well as resident at the Millay Colony for the Arts, Yaddo and the MacDowell Colony. Grants Morris has received include fellowships of the New York Foundation for the Arts, Creative Capital and the Asian Cultural Council. In 2021, Morris received a John Simon Guggenheim Fellowship for Poetry.

Consultant, workshop leader, panelist
Morris leads workshops on creative writing, voice and planning consultations for activists, artists, youth, women, postgraduate students and underserved communities as well as private and non-profit groups. She is in demand as a panelist, respondent and guest artist on panels, serving for prestigious educational organizations including Modern Language Association, Associated Writing Program, Columbia University, Princeton University, MIT, Pomona College, Dartmouth College, Smith College, University of Arizona, Scholastic Art and Writing Awards, Lower Manhattan Cultural Council, the Creative Capital Foundation, the Community of Literary Magazines and Presses, the Cave Canem Foundation, and The Pew Center for Arts and Culture, among others.  Morris is a consultant for educational and arts organizations. She has served on board of trustees/board of directors, committees and artist advisory boards for: the New York Foundation for the Arts, New York State Council on the Arts, African Voices, the Black Rock Coalition and other national and grassroots institutions. She is also a workshop leader for innovative poetry conducting intensives for St. Mark's Poetry Project, Atlantic Center for the Arts, Poets' House, Naropa University, Kore Press and other national arts organizations.

Featured recordings
With Elliott Sharp
Terraplane: Forgery
Terraplane: Secret Life
Radio-Hyper-Yahoo
Terraplane: Sky Road Songs
4AM Always

With Uri Caine
The Goldberg Variations (Winter & Winter, 2000)

Books

Chap-T-Her Won, 1993, TM Ink

Intermission, 1998, Soft Skull Press

"Rhyme Scheme", 2012, Zasterle Press

Handholding: 5 kinds, 2016, Kore Press 
Best American Experimental Writing 2016 (a.k.a. BAX 2016) co-edited with Charles Bernstein, Seth Abramson, Jesse Damiani, Wesleyan University Press, 2017

Per Form/Hard Kore: joca seria press 2017 (English with French translation by Olivier Brosard, Vincent Broqua, Abigail Lang)

Who Do With Words: Chax Press 2018

Poetry 

401 Requiem

Boating Duozetuor

Slave Sho' to Video Aka Black but Beautiful

The Mrs. Gets Her Ass Kicked

Project Princess

Leonine Viewing

Notes

References
The Columbia Granger's Index to Poetry in Anthologies by Tessa Kale
Right to Rock: The Black Rock Coalition and the Cultural Politics of Race by Maureen Mahon
The Stamp of Class: Reflections on Poetry and Social Class by Gary Lenhart
Uptown Conversation: The New Jazz Studies by Robert O'Meally, Brent Hayes Edwards, and Farah Jasmine Griffin
Living in Spanglish: The Search for Latino Identity in America by Ed Morales, St. Martin's Press: 2003
Production Notebooks Volume 2 by Mark Bly
Geography: Art/race/exile by Ralph Lemon and Ann Daly
Listen Up! by Zoe Angelsey
Girls Guide to Taking Over the World: Writings From The Girl Zine Revolution by Tristan Taormino, Karen Green, and Ann Magnuson
Poetry Slam: The Competitive Art of Performance Poetry by Gary Mex Glazner
We Who Love to Be Astonished: Experimental Women’s Writing and Performance Poetics. edited by Laura Hinton and Cynthia Hogue.
The Muse is Music: Jazz Poetry from the Harlem Renaissance to Spoken Word by Meta DuEwa Jones University of Illinois Press, 2011
Choice Voice Noise: Soundings in Innovative African American Poetry by Kathleen Crown in "Assembling Alternatives: Reading Postmodern Poetries Transnationally" edited by Romana Huk, Wesleyan University Press, 2003
Ranft, Erin (January 2014). "The Afrofuturist Poetry of Tracie Morris and Tracy K. Smith". Journal of Ethnic American Literature

External links
The Land and the People - The Poets.
Personal website
 PennSound page, many recordings and videos.
 Poetry Foundation.
 Poetry MP3 Picks - Poems for online listening
 Jon Pareles, "Music Review: A Steamy Mix of Poetry, Afrocentric Themes and Love" (on Tracie Morris's Sonic Synthesis), New York Times, December 18, 1999.
 Rakim's Performativity 
 Speaking for Myself 

Living people
Writers from Brooklyn
New York University alumni
Hunter College alumni
American sound artists
Women sound artists
Year of birth missing (living people)
Poets from New York (state)
American women poets
African-American poets
21st-century African-American people
21st-century African-American women
African-American women writers
Iowa Writers' Workshop faculty